My Best Friend's Story is a 2020 Chinese drama television series directed by Shen Yan and starring Ni Ni and Liu Shishi. The series follows the story of  friendship between two stunningly beautiful women who forged a close bond when they were still young.  They supported each other through thick and thin. The series airs on CCTV-8 and iQIYI starting from December 28, 2020 to January 15, 2021.

Plot
Jiang Nansun (Liu Shishi) and Zhu Suosuo (Ni Ni) were born into two completely opposite families, but this did not prevent them from becoming each other's best friends. They have known each other since they were very young and spent a carefree childhood with each other. Jiang Nansun is a daughter who was born with a golden spoon. Although she was a good girl since she was a child, there is actually a rebellious power hidden in her heart. Zhu Suosuo grew up in a broken family, so she has an unlimited desire for marriage and family.

The dual changes of family and love left Jiang Nansun at a loss. At this moment, Zhu Suosuo stepped forward and took in Jiang Nansun, who had nowhere to go. With Zhu Suosuo's help, Jiang Nansun insisted on completing her studies and entering the workplace. However, Zhu Suosuo, who finally got married and suffered an emotional change after marriage. At this time, Jiang Nansun gradually matures in thought and perception. The two girls supported each other and healed each other.

Cast

Main
Liu Shishi as Jiang Nansun
Han Xitong as Jiang Nansun (young)
Ni Ni as Zhu Suosuo
Yang Kexin as Zhu Suosuo (young)
Dong Zijian as Xie Hongzu, Zhu Suosuo's husband
Tian Yu as Fan Jingang, Ye Jinyan's assistant
Wang Xiao as Yang Ke
Tony Yang as Wang Yongzheng
 Eric Yang Le as Zhang Anren
Chen Daoming as Ye Jinyan

Supporting
Yuan Quan as Xia Qian
He Hongshan as Yuan Yuan 
Wu Yue as Qi Xin
Yu Xiaowei as Li Yifan
Chang Chen-kuang as Mr. Jiang 
Wang Lin as Xie Jianan
Yang Xinming as Professor Dong
Tan Kai as Zhu Suosuo's father 
Wu Yanshu as Granny Jiang
Guo Yang as Li Lian
Wu Yufang as Mrs. Jiang
Wang Yuanda as Xiao He
Qu Zheming as Luo Jiaming
Shi An as Li Ang
Hou Changrong as Uncle
Zhu Yin as Aunt 
Tong Yue as Mr. Ma
Shi Yueling as Manager Pan
Feng Hui as Bao Luo
Tom Price as Ai Dehua
Zhu Zhu as Female Customer 
Huang Zhenghao as Fei Yuqing
Ma Ye La Ma Ge Lu as Ma Yila
Jin Feng as Ai Bo Er
Guo Tongtong as  Zhou Qing
Rong Fei as Tony
Rong Zixi as Zhao Malin 
Zhao Yang as Da Luo
Ke Yu as Nan Fang
Sun Qiang as Wang Feiyu
Chang Di as Xiao Yu
Cao Lei as Xiao Ding

Ratings 

 Highest ratings are marked in red, lowest ratings are marked in blue

Awards and nominations

References

External links

2020 Chinese television series debuts
2021 Chinese television series endings
China Central Television original programming
Chinese drama television series
Chinese television series
IQIYI original programming
Mandarin-language television shows
Television shows based on Chinese novels
Television series by New Classics Media
Television shows set in Shanghai